An airline alliance is an aviation industry arrangement between two or more airlines agreeing to cooperate on a substantial level. Alliances may provide marketing branding to facilitate travelers making inter-airline codeshare connections within countries. This branding may involve unified aircraft liveries of member aircraft.

In 2015, Star Alliance was the largest with 23% of total scheduled traffic in Revenue passenger kilometres (RPKs)/revenue passenger miles (RPMs), followed by SkyTeam with 20.4% and Oneworld with 17.8%, leaving % for others.
In 2019, by number of passengers, Star Alliance was leading 762 million, followed by SkyTeam (630 million) and Oneworld (535 million).

Rationale
Benefits can consist of an extended network, often realised through codeshare agreements. Many alliances started as only codeshare networks. Cost reductions come from sharing operation facilities (e.g. catering or computer systems), operation staff (e.g. ground handling personnel, at check-in and boarding desks), investments and purchases (e.g. in order to negotiate extra volume discounts). Traveller benefits can include lower prices due to lowered operational costs for a given route, different times to choose from, more destinations within easy reach, shorter travel times, more options of airport lounges shared with alliance members, fast track access on all alliance members if having frequent flyer status, faster mileage rewards by earning miles for a single account on several different carriers, round-the-world tickets, enabling travellers to fly over the world for a relatively low price.

Airline alliances may also create disadvantages for the traveller, such as higher prices when competition is erased on a certain route or less frequent flights; for instance, if two airlines separately fly three and two times a day respectively on a shared route, their alliance might fly less than 5 (3+2) times a day on the same route. This might be especially true between hub cities for each airline. e.g., flights between Detroit Metropolitan Wayne County Airport (a Delta Air Lines fortress hub) and Amsterdam Airport Schiphol (a KLM fortress hub).

History 
The first airline alliance was formed in the 1930s, when Panair do Brasil and its parent company Pan American World Airways agreed to exchange routes to Latin America. In 1990, the African Joint Air Services (AJAS) Accord between Tanzania, Uganda and Zambia led to the launch of Alliance Air in 1994, with South African Airways, Air Tanzania, Uganda Airlines and the governments of Uganda and Tanzania as shareholders.

The first large alliance began in 1989, when Northwest Airlines and KLM agreed to large-scale codesharing. In 1992, the Netherlands signed the first open skies agreement with the United States, in spite of objections from the European Union, which gave both countries unrestricted landing rights on the other's soil. Normally landing rights are granted for a fixed number of flights per week to a fixed destination. Each adjustment requires negotiations, often between governments rather than between the companies involved. In return, the United States granted antitrust immunity to the alliance between Northwest Airlines and KLM. Other alliances would struggle for years to overcome the transnational barriers and lack of antitrust immunity, and still do so.

Star Alliance was founded in 1997, which brought competing airlines to form Oneworld in 1999 and SkyTeam in 2000.

In 2007 Tai Tung Alliance was founded. There are three airlines, Korean based City Express, Japan based Super Flyer and Spain based Vacation Line.

In 2010 Richard Branson, chairman of the Virgin Group, announced his intention to form a fourth alliance among Virgin branded airlines (Virgin Atlantic; Virgin America; and the Virgin Australia Holdings group of airlines). Then in September 2011, Branson said that Virgin Atlantic would join one of the existing alliances; this idea was repeated in October 2012. In December 2012, Delta Air Lines purchased Singapore Airlines' 49% stake in Virgin Atlantic for £224 million. Virgin America was absorbed into Alaska Airlines, which joined the Oneworld alliance in 2021.

On February 14, 2013, it was announced that American Airlines and US Airways would merge, retaining the American Airlines name and would remain in the Oneworld alliance. US Airways' participation in Star Alliance lapsed. In 2012, in South America, LAN Airlines and TAM Airlines began their merger. In March 2014, with the merger complete, TAM left Star Alliance and became part of LAN in Oneworld.

On September 21, 2015, the Vanilla Alliance was formed between several airlines based in the Indian Ocean region, in order to improve air connectivity within the region. The founding members are Air Austral, Air Mauritius, Air Madagascar, Air Seychelles, and Int'Air Îles.

On January 18, 2016, the first alliance of low-cost carriers was formed, U-FLY Alliance. The founding members—HK Express, Lucky Air, Urumqi Air, and West Air—are all affiliated with HNA Group, although the alliance is also seeking airlines not within the group.

On May 16, 2016, the world's largest alliance of low-cost carriers was formed, Value Alliance. The founding members were Cebu Pacific, Cebgo, Jeju Air, Nok Air, NokScoot, Scoot Airlines, Tigerair, Tigerair Australia, and Vanilla Air.

Current alliances

Star Alliance 

Star Alliance, founded in 1997, currently has 26 members:

 Aegean Airlines, 2010
 Air Canada, founder
 Air China, 2007
 Air India, 2014
 Air New Zealand, 1999
 All Nippon Airways, 1999
 Asiana Airlines, 2003
 Austrian Airlines, 2000
 Avianca, 2012
 Brussels Airlines, 2009
 Copa Airlines, 2012
 Croatia Airlines, 2004
 EgyptAir, 2008
 Ethiopian Airlines, 2011
 EVA Air, 2013
 LOT Polish Airlines, 2003
 Lufthansa, founder
   Scandinavian Airlines, founder
 Shenzhen Airlines, 2012
 Singapore Airlines, 2000
 South African Airways, 2006
 Swiss International Air Lines, 2006
 TAP Air Portugal, 2005
 Thai Airways International, founder
 Turkish Airlines, 2008
 United Airlines, founder

Former members:

Star Alliance Connecting Partners 
 Juneyao Airlines, 2017
 Thai Smile, 2020

Oneworld 

Oneworld, founded in 1999, currently has 13 members:

 Alaska Airlines, 2021
 American Airlines, founder
 British Airways, founder
 Cathay Pacific, founder
 Finnair, 1999
 Iberia Airlines, 1999
 Japan Airlines, 2007
 Malaysia Airlines, 2013
 Qantas, founder
 Qatar Airways, 2013
 Royal Air Maroc, 2020
 Royal Jordanian, 2007
 SriLankan Airlines, 2014

Former members:

Future member:

  Oman Air, joining in 2024

Oneworld Connect Partners 
 Fiji Airways, 2018
Oneworld Transatlantic Joint Venture members

  Aer Lingus

SkyTeam 

SkyTeam, founded in 2000, currently has 19 members:

 Aerolíneas Argentinas, 2012
 Aeroméxico, founder
 Air Europa, 2007
 Air France, founder
 China Airlines, 2011
 China Eastern Airlines, 2011
 Czech Airlines, 2001
 Delta Air Lines, founder
 Garuda Indonesia, 2014
 ITA Airways, 2021
 Kenya Airways, 2007
 KLM Royal Dutch Airlines, 2004
 Korean Air, founder
 Middle East Airlines, 2012
 Saudia, 2012
 TAROM, 2010
 Vietnam Airlines, 2010
 Virgin Atlantic, 2023
 XiamenAir, 2012

Former members:

Vanilla Alliance 

Vanilla Alliance, founded in 2015, currently has 5 members:

 Air Austral, founder
 Air Madagascar, founder
 Air Mauritius, founder
 Air Seychelles, founder
 Int'Air Îles, founder

U-FLY Alliance 

U-FLY Alliance, founded in 2016, currently has 4 members:

 Eastar Jet, 2016
 Lucky Air, founder
 Urumqi Air, founder
 West Air, founder

Former members:
 HK Express, 2016-2019, founder

Value Alliance 

Value Alliance, founded in 2016, currently has 5 members:

 Cebu Pacific, founder
 Cebgo, founder
 Jeju Air, founder
 Nok Air, founder
 Scoot, founder

Former members:
 NokScoot, 2016–2020, defunct
 Tigerair, 2016–2017, merged with Scoot
 Tigerair Australia, 2016–2018, founder
 Vanilla Air, 2016–2018, founder, merged with Peach Aviation

Statistics

Notes and references

External links

 Oneworld
 SkyTeam
 Star Alliance
 Value Alliance